Triumph is a 2021 American drama film directed by Brett Leonard and starring RJ Mitte and Terrence Howard.  It is based on the life story of screenwriter Michael D. Coffey.

Cast
RJ Mitte as Mike
Colton Haynes as Jeff
Johnathon Schaech as Doug
Grace Victoria Cox as Patty
Terrence Howard as Coach Cutting

Release
The film was released theatrically on April 30, 2021.

Reception
The film has a 40% rating on Rotten Tomatoes based on five reviews.

Phuong Le of The Guardian awarded the film two stars out of five and wrote, "...this underdog, coming-of-age sports movie has a big heart but lacks the competency to execute its aspirational premise."

Trace Sauveur of The Austin Chronicle also awarded the film two stars out of five and wrote, "Though good-natured, by the end it feels indistinguishable from an extended after-school special."

Ben Kenigsberg of The New York Times gave the film a negative review and wrote that Mitte "sells Mike's tenacity, but the contrivances around him let him down."

References

External links
 
 

2021 films
2021 drama films
American drama films
2020s English-language films
2020s American films